This is a list of albums released under AOMG.

2010s

2013

2014

2015

2016

2017

2018

2019

2020s

2020

2021

2022

2023

References 

 

Discographies of South Korean record labels
Hip hop discographies